Planter or Planters may refer to:

Common meanings
 A flowerpot or box for plants
 Jardiniere, one such type of pot, mostly indoor types
 Cachepot, another term for the same
 Flower box, another type of planter, mostly for outdoors
 Window box, a planter attached to a windowsill, on the outside
 Sub-irrigated planter, a planting box where the water is introduced from the bottom
 A person or object engaged in sowing seeds
 Planter (farm implement), implement towed behind a tractor, used for sowing crops through a field
 Potato planter, a machine for planting potato tubers and simultaneously applying mineral fertilizers to the soil

History
 A coloniser
 Plantations of Ireland, 16th and 17th centuries
 Ancient planter, a colonist receiving one of the first land grants in Virginia
 New England Planters, settlers who moved to the Canadian maritime provinces which had been left vacant by the Acadian Expulsion
 Old Planters (Massachusetts), early settlers of Massachusetts
 A farmer
 Planter class, in the American antebellum South
 A supervisor of a plantation, particularly in the Far East under the British Empire
 Church planter, a person engaged in creating a new Christian church

Companies
 Planters, the American snack food company best known for its processed nuts and the "Mr. Peanut" mascot
 Planters Bank, which merged with Peoples Bank of Rocky Mount, North Carolina, United States in 1990 to form Centura Bank
 Planters Inn, hotel in Savannah, Georgia
 Union Planters, a former bank in the United States
 Planters Development Bank or Plantersbank, a former bank in the Philippines

Military
 , a number of ships of the U.S. Navy
 , a number of commercial steam ships
 Mine planter, a mine warfare ship of the early days of World War I

Sports
 Planters Pat Bradley International, a former golf tournament

Baseball
 Clarksdale Planters, a minor league baseball team in Mississippi, United States
 New London Planters, a minor league baseball team in Connecticut, United States

Culture
 Igor Planter, a fictional eco-terrorist in the 2000-2004 manga Black Cat
 The Planter, a 1917 American drama film directed by Thomas N. Heffron and John Ince

Other uses
 Planter, Georgia, a community in the United States
 Planters Hall, a historic place in Vicksburg, Mississippi, United States
 Planter's Punch, a cocktail

See also 

 Plantar